The Pastoral Symphony is Beethoven's Symphony No. 6.

Pastoral Symphony may also refer to:

Classical music
Pastoral Symphony (Vaughan Williams), Symphony No. 3 by Ralph Vaughan Williams
A Pastoral Symphony, Symphony No. 2 by Alan Rawsthorne
Pastoral Symphony, or Pifa, a movement of Händel's Messiah
Symphony No. 7 (Glazunov), by Alexander Glazunov, occasionally called Pastoral

Other uses
Pastoral Symphony (Australian band)
La Symphonie pastorale, a novella by André Gide, 1919
Pastoral Symphony (film), a 1946 film adaptation
Symphonie Pastorale (film), a 1958 Australian TV broadcast

See also
Pastoral (disambiguation)
Pastorale (disambiguation)

Symphonies